The Kawasaki Mach I (model designation S1) was a  Kawasaki motorcycle made 1972 through 1975.

History
The Mach I was a direct result of the widespread success of the Kawasaki H1 Mach III 500 cc introduced in 1969. The S1 Mach I replaced the twin Kawasaki A1 Samurai 250 with its twin-cylinder, Kawasaki rotary disc valve engine which produced  at 8,000 rpm.

The S1 Mach I emerged nearly one year after its bigger brother, the S2 Mach II 350, and from the development success of the Kawasaki H1 Mach III. It was essentially the same motorcycle as its larger brother with less displacement. It had a separate handlebar holder and steering friction damper.
Its successor, the KH250, was essentially the same bike with a different name, was marketed from 1976 to 1981.

Notes

References

 Alastair Walker, The Kawasaki Triple Bible, November 2010
 Weekblad Motor. April 14 1972. p. 542
 Motor Cycle Mechanics. August 1975. p. 55
 Motorrad Katalog 1972/73 and 1974 

Standard motorcycles
S1 Mach I 250
Motorcycles introduced in 1972